The Monopoly of Violence is a 2020 French documentary film directed by David Dufresne.

Subject matter 
The film questions riot control in France, as well as the legitimacy of the state's use of violence, especially police brutality in France.

The film depicts clashes between the police and demonstrators during the yellow vest movement. It uses footage from demonstrators and independent journalists and was shot from November 2018 to February 2020.

The images are discussed in a series of dialogues between representatives of social movements, intellectuals and police officers.

These two-way discussions allow interpretation of the raw material using key concepts such as the monopoly on violence.

See also 
 National Police (France)
 Police brutality

References

External links 

French documentary films
2020 films
Works about police brutality
2020 documentary films
2020s French films